The Nantucket Independent was a weekly newspaper on Nantucket founded by Don Costanzo. It first went into circulation on July 2, 2003, and over the span of five years earned numerous state, regional and national awards for both editorial and advertising excellence.  GateHouse Media New England purchased the newspaper in April, 2008. In September 2010 GateHouse suspended publication and closed its Nantucket office.

External links
 http://www.nantucketindependent.com/ Newspaper website.

In September 2010, GateHouseMedia suspended publication of the Nantucket Independent.

Newspapers published in Massachusetts
Nantucket, Massachusetts
Independent newspapers published in the United States